Borophagus hilli is an extinct species of the genus Borophagus of the subfamily Borophaginae, a group of canids endemic to North America from the Late Miocene until the Pliocene.

Overview
Borophagus hilli was named by C. S. Johnston in 1939. Though not the most massive borophagine by size or weight, it had a more highly evolved capacity to crunch bone than earlier, larger genera such as Epicyon, which seems to be an evolutionary trend of the group (Turner, 2004). During the Pliocene epoch, Borophagus began being displaced by Canis genera such as Canis edwardii and later by Canis dirus. Early species of Borophagus were placed in the genus Osteoborus until recently, but the genera are now considered synonyms. Borophagus hilli possibly led a hyena-like lifestyle scavenging carcasses of recently dead animals.

Taxonomy
Typical features of this genus are a bulging forehead and powerful jaws; it was probably a scavenger. Its crushing premolar teeth and strong jaw muscles would have been used to crack open bone, much like the hyena of the Old World. The adult animal is estimated to have been about 80 cm in length, similar to a coyote, although it was much more powerfully built.

Recombination
Borophagus hilli was synonymized subjectively with Borophagus direptor by Kurten and Anderson in 1980 as well as synonymous with Osteoborus crassapineatus, Osteoborus progressus. It was recombined as Borophagus hilli by Xiaoming Wang et al. in 1999.

Fossil distribution
Borophagus hilli fossil specimens are widespread from east central Florida to southeastern Washington, from Idaho to New Mexico to Texas. Specimens were also found as far south as the Cuscatlán Formation of El Salvador.

References

Further reading 
 Russell Hunt, "Ecological Polarities Of the North American Family Canidae: A New Approach to Understanding Forty Million Years of Canid Evolution" (Accessed 1/30/06).
 Alan Turner, "National Geographic:  Prehistoric Mammals" (Washington, D.C.:  Firecrest Books Ltd., 2004), pp. 112–114.  
 Wang et al., "Phylogenetic Systematics of the Borophaginae (Carnivora:Canidae)."  Bulletin of the American Museum of Natural History, No. 243, Nov. 17 1999. (PDF) (Accessed 4/11/06)
 Xiaoming Wang, "The Origin and Evolution of the Dog Family"  Accessed 1/30/06.

External links 
 Picture of an Osteoborus skull in a museum, from "World of the Wolf."  (Accessed 6/19/06)

Borophagines
Miocene canids
Pliocene carnivorans
Neogene mammals of North America
Blancan
Hemphillian
Fossils of El Salvador
Fossils of Mexico
Fossils of the United States
Fossil taxa described in 1939
Ringold Formation Miocene Fauna

zh:恐犬